Arthur Vitelli (born 4 June 2000) is a French professional footballer who plays as a centre-back for Polish club Podbeskidzie Bielsko-Biała, on loan from Guingamp.

Career
Vitelli began his career with the reserves of Dijon in 2017. He transferred to the reserves of Guingamp in the summer 2021. He made his professional debut with the senior Guingamp side in a 3–0 Ligue 2 loss to Amiens on 22 January 2022. On 10 June 2022, he signed a professional contract with Guingamp.

On 5 January 2023, he was sent on loan to Polish I liga side Podbeskidzie Bielsko-Biała until the end of the season, with an option to buy.

References

External links
 

2000 births
Living people
Sportspeople from Dijon
Footballers from Bourgogne-Franche-Comté
French footballers
Association football defenders
En Avant Guingamp players
Podbeskidzie Bielsko-Biała players
Ligue 2 players
Championnat National 2 players
Championnat National 3 players
French expatriate footballers
Expatriate footballers in Poland
French expatriate sportspeople in Poland